Radio 1 or Radio One most commonly refers to:
BBC Radio 1, a music radio station from the BBC
BBC Radio 1Xtra, a digital radio station broadcasting black music
CBC Radio One, a talk radio station operated by the Canadian Broadcasting Corporation
Radio 1 or Radio One may also refer to:

Stations 
Radio 1 (Belgium), a talk radio station operated by the Flemish public broadcaster
Radio Uno (Chile), a Chilean station playing only national music
Radio 1 (Czech Republic), a commercial music radio station in Prague
Radio 1 FM (The Gambia), an independent station based in Serrekunda
Radio 1 (Ghana), a station operated by the Ghana Broadcasting Corporation
Radio One (India), a commercial radio station in several Indian cities
NPO Radio 1, a talk radio station operated by the Nederlandse Publieke Omroep
RTÉ Radio 1, a talk radio station operated by the Irish public broadcaster 
Rai Radio 1, a talk radio station operated by the Italian public broadcaster
Radio One (Lebanon), a defunct Lebanese radio station
Radio One (Mauritius), a private commercial radio station in Mauritius
Radio One (New Zealand), a student radio station in Dunedin
Radyo 1 of the Turkish Radio and Television Corporation

Networks 
Radio 1 (Norway), a network of commercial radio stations in Oslo, Trondheim, Bergen and Stavanger
Urban One, a U.S. network radio operator, formerly Radio One

Music
 Radio One (album), a 1988 album by the Jimi Hendrix Experience